115 may refer to:
115 (number), the number
AD 115, a year in the 2nd century AD
115 BC, a year in the 2nd century BC
115 (Hampshire Fortress) Corps Engineer Regiment, Royal Engineers, a unit in the UK Territorial Army
115 (Leicestershire) Field Park Squadron, Royal Engineers, a unit in the UK Territorial Army
115 (New Jersey bus)
115 (barge), a whaleback barge
115 km, rural locality in Russia
The homeless emergency telephone number in France

11/5 may refer to:
 11/5, an American hip hop group from San Francisco, California
 November 5 (month–day date notation)
 May 11 (day–month date notation)
 {11/5}, a type of regular hendecagram

1/15 may refer to:
 January 15 (month–day date notation)

See also
Moscovium, synthetic chemical element with atomic number 115